Somehow may refer to:

"Somehow", a song by The Vapors from the 1980 album New Clear Days
"Somehow", a song by Drake Bell from the 2005 album Telegraph
"Somehow", a song by Joss Stone from the 2011 album LP1